West Gladstone is an unincorporated community in Delta County, in the U.S. state of Michigan.

History
West Gladstone was named from its location west of Gladstone, Michigan.

References

Unincorporated communities in Delta County, Michigan